Edmar Lacerda da Silva  or simply  Edmar  (19 April 1982) is a Brazilian defender who plays for 1º de Dezembro.

External links
 

1982 births
Living people
Brazilian footballers
Brazilian expatriate footballers
AD Ceuta footballers
C.D. Olivais e Moscavide players
Doxa Katokopias FC players
Alki Larnaca FC players
AEL Limassol players
Enosis Neon Paralimni FC players
Karmiotissa FC players
Cypriot First Division players
Cypriot Second Division players
Expatriate footballers in Cyprus
Brazilian expatriate sportspeople in Cyprus
Expatriate footballers in Spain
Association football defenders